Roberto Lopes de Miranda, sometimes known as just Roberto (born in São Gonçalo, Rio de Janeiro State, 31 July 1943) is a former association footballer in striker role. His nickname was "Vendaval" (meaning: Gale)

In career (1962–1976) he played for Botafogo, Flamengo, Corinthians and América. He won two Rio de Janeiro State Championship (1967, 1968) and one Brazilian Cup in 1968. For Brazilian team he played 12 games from 1968 to 1972, scored 6 goals. He was also part of the team that won the 1970 FIFA World Cup, playing in two matches.

Together with Jairzinho, Robert Miranda formed a potent strike force which helped Botafogo to win the Rio (Carioca) Championship consecutively in 1967 and 1968. Roberto was a forthright striker much loved by the Botafogo supporters.

In the 1960s, Santos of Pelé, Coutinho, Zito, Edu etc. and Botafogo of Zequinha, Gerson, Jairzinho, Roberto Miranda and Paulo Cesar were the two best teams in Brazil. Botafogo supporters believe that this attack is one of the best attacks of all times in the world.

Roberto Miranda left Botafogo to play in Mexico. He may have played for other teams but he will always be best known as a Botafogo striker.

Botafogo
Club's World Cup (Caracas Triangular Tournament): 1967, 1968 and 1970
Torneio Roberto Gomes Pedrosa:1964 and 1966
Brazil Cup: 1968
Rio-São Paulo Tournament: 1964 and 1966
State Championship: 1962, 1967 and 1968
Taça Guanabara: 1967, 1968
Carranza Cup: 1966
Cup Circle Journals & Outdoors: 1966
Mexico Hexagonal: 1968

References

External links
 

1943 births
Living people
Brazilian footballers
Association football forwards
Footballers at the 1964 Summer Olympics
Olympic footballers of Brazil
Botafogo de Futebol e Regatas players
1970 FIFA World Cup players
FIFA World Cup-winning players
Brazil international footballers
People from São Gonçalo, Rio de Janeiro
Sportspeople from Rio de Janeiro (state)